Green Quarter Fell is an upland area in the east of the English Lake District, near Kentmere village, Cumbria. It is the subject of a chapter of Wainwright's book The Outlying Fells of Lakeland. He says that the walk offers: "... a perfectly-balanced and lovely view of upper Kentmere ... that cries aloud for a camera."

References

 

Fells of the Lake District